The Weber River is a  long river of northern Utah, United States.  It begins in the northwest of the Uinta Mountains and empties into the Great Salt Lake.  The Weber River was named for American fur trapper John Henry Weber.

The Weber River rises in the northwest of the Uinta Mountains, at the foot of peaks including Bald Mountain, Notch Mountain, and Mount Watson. It passes by Oakley, and fills the reservoir of Rockport Lake, then turns north, receiving the flow of major tributaries Silver Creek and at Coalville, Chalk Creek. Coalville is also at the upper end of Echo Reservoir; Below the reservoir, the river passes Henefer, turns more westerly, and then passes Morgan, where it receives East Canyon Creek. Issuing out of the mountains at Uintah at the mouth of Weber Canyon, it turns north again where it is joined by the Ogden River west of Ogden. The combined stream meanders across mostly-flat land, entering mud flats near where it empties into the Great Salt Lake, contributing about 25 percent of the total water entering the lake.

Among the fish to be found in the river are brook, brown, Bonneville cutthroat and stocked rainbow trout, and mountain whitefish.

The Weber has long been used for irrigation and is part of the United States Bureau of Reclamation's Weber Basin Project. Among the dams on the Weber are Wanship Dam on Rockport Reservoir (completed 1957) and Echo Dam (completed 1931).

The Weber River is also home to a rare plant species Stephanomeria occultata, also known as Disguised or Hidden Wirelettuce, which is endemic to rocky slopes and margins along the corridor (B. Wellard & J.W. Baker 2018).

See also
 List of rivers of Utah
 List of rivers in the Great Basin

References

 
Wellard, B., & Baker, J. (2018). Stephanomeria occultata (Asteraceae: Cichorieae), a New Species of Wirelettuce from Northern Utah, and a Key to all Perennial Wirelettuce. Systematic Botany, 43(2), 595–601.

External links
 

Rivers of Utah
Features of the Uinta Mountains
Rivers of Weber County, Utah
Rivers of Summit County, Utah
Rivers of Morgan County, Utah
Tributaries of the Great Salt Lake